Ivan V Alekseyevich (– ) was Tsar of Russia between 1682 and 1696, jointly ruling with his younger half-brother Peter I. Ivan was the youngest son of Alexis I of Russia by his first wife, Maria Miloslavskaya, while Peter was the only son of Alexis by his second wife, Natalya Naryshkina. Ivan's reign was solely titular because he had serious physical and mental issues.

Early life and accession
Ivan V was born in 1666 in Moscow, the youngest son of Tsar Alexis and Maria Miloslavskaya. Only two of his older brothers survived childhood; his eldest brother, Alexei, died aged 15 in 1670, therefore his second brother, Feodor, became tsar upon the death of their father. When Feodor died in 1682 without issue, the court was faced with a crisis of succession, because Ivan, the next-oldest brother, was thought to be "infirm in body and mind." It was proposed that he be passed over in favor of his younger half-brother, Peter, who was only 10 years old at this time, but was healthy in mind and body, and could be expected to provide adequate leadership in adulthood.

The church and the Naryshkins (family of Peter's mother, Natalya Naryshkina) supported Peter's proposed ascension to the throne. However, the family of Ivan V's mother (the Miloslavski) and Ivan's older sister, Sofia Alekseyevna, in particular, disputed the move. Rumors spread around Moscow that Feodor III had been poisoned and Ivan strangled by boyars so that the 10-year-old Peter could become Tsar. These rumours fomented the Moscow Uprising of 1682, and the streltsy stormed the Kremlin. These disturbances subsided only after Ivan appeared in person in the city, and proved to everyone that he was alive and well.

The streltsy demanded that Ivan be named tsar, and a compromise was found by declaring Ivan and Peter as co-rulers, with a regency government until the boys came of age. Sofia Alekseyevna, who had been influential at court during her brother Feodor's reign, was named regent.

Tsar and co-ruler
On 25 June 1682, less than two months after the death of Feodor III, Ivan and Peter were crowned in the Cathedral of the Dormition as co-Tsars. A special throne with two seats was commissioned for the occasion (now on display in the Kremlin Armoury). While Ivan was 16 years old at this time, his co-ruler Peter I was only 10. Ivan was considered the "senior tsar", but actual power was wielded by Sophia Alekseyevna, Ivan's full sister and Peter's half-sister, for the next seven years.

Sophia was always considerate of Ivan, although she is never known to have consulted him on any important matter. She was anxious that every outward sign of respect and deference be paid to Ivan, which was a subtle way of undermining the influence of Peter's faction in court. Thus, every wish or opinion expressed by Ivan was deferred to, and his general prestige in court remained intact during the years of Sophia's regency. As Peter grew up, he and his faction, led by his mother's Naryshkin family, contended with Regent Sophia for influence and power. Indeed, Sophia is blamed (perhaps unfairly, as a tactic of defamation) for the murders of Peter's uncles on his mother's side of the family. Due to this and other factors, tension arose between the factions of the two co-tsars.

In 1689, Peter was 17, and intent upon declaring his majority and demanding power. To pre-empt this, Sophia attempted to raise a riot in the city, spreading the rumour that the Naryshkins had destroyed Ivan's crown and were poised to set his room on fire. This was untrue, and when riots began, Ivan's tutor, Prince Prozorovsky, persuaded him to publicly declare his faith in his brother Peter and make it known that he was unharmed and in no danger for life or liberty. Ivan did this, and also supported Peter's contention that the time had come for terminating the regency. Peter was declared to be of age, and Sophia's regency was terminated. Ivan being both incapable and disinterested, Peter came into his own and functioned as though he were the sole tsar. The eventual result was that, over time, the outward signs of deference and power which Ivan had enjoyed during the regency slowly withered away, and he became a non-entity in the Russian court. For the last decade of his life, Ivan was completely overshadowed by the more energetic Peter I. He spent his days with his wife, Praskovia Saltykova, caring about little but "fasting and praying, day and night".

Marriage and issue

In late 1683 or early 1684, Ivan married Praskovia Saltykova, daughter of Fyodor Petrovich Saltykov, a minor nobleman, by his wife, whose name is uncertain – it was either Yekaterina Fyodorovna or Anna Mikhailovna Tatishcheva. Ivan's marriage was arranged in the traditional style of Russian rulers: he selected a bride from a parade of potential candidates. 

Praskovia Saltykova, who came from a rather obscure family, had been raised in a middle-class household and adhered to conventional values and moral standards. She bonded strongly with her gentle and simple-minded husband and became the mainstay of his life. She proved to be an exemplary wife to a mentally challenged man. Her moral character, simple lifestyle, charity, piety and non-involvement in politics were admired by all. She earned the lifelong respect of her powerful brother-in-law, Peter the Great, who entrusted the care and education of his own two daughters to her, imploring her to bring them up to be just like herself.

Ivan's purported debility did not prevent him from producing robust offspring, and Praskovia bore him five daughters, three of whom lived to adulthood. Their children were:

 Maria Ivanovna (1689–1692), died in infancy
 Feodosia Ivanovna (1690–1691), died in infancy
 Ekaterina Ivanovna (1691–1733), grandmother of the unfortunate Ivan VI of Russia
 Anna Ivanovna (1693–1740), ruled as Empress of Russia; no issue
 Praskovia Ivanovna (1694–1731), had issue one son who died in infancy

Death and succession
At the age of 27, Ivan was described by foreign ambassadors as senile, paralytic and almost blind. He died two years later, on 8 February 1696, and was interred in the Archangel Cathedral. It was fortuitous to Peter's faction that Ivan produced several daughters but no sons, as there was no confusion regarding the succession of the crown upon his death. His co-ruler was left to become supreme ruler of Russia; with Ivan's death, the struggle for power within the family had finally ended.

In 1730, more than 30 years after Ivan's death, his second surviving daughter, Anna, Duchess of Courland, was invited to the throne of Russia by the country's privy council. She ruled for more than 10 years, and was succeeded by Ivan's infant great-grandson Ivan VI; however, a palace coup engineered in 1741 by Ivan's niece Elizabeth resulted in the throne passing finally to the progeny of Peter the Great.

See also
Rulers of Russia family tree

Notes

References

External links

 Romanovs. The second film. Feodor III, Sophia Alekseyevna; Ivan V; – Historical reconstruction "The Romanovs". StarMedia. Babich-Design(Russia, 2013)

1666 births
1696 deaths
17th-century Russian monarchs
Russian people with disabilities
Russian tsars
House of Romanov
Royalty from Moscow
Modern child monarchs
Eastern Orthodox monarchs
People with epilepsy
Royalty and nobility with disabilities
Russian tsareviches
Children of Alexis of Russia